San Zeno is the Italian name of Zeno of Verona, an Italian Catholic saint.

It may also refer to:

Places

Italy
San Zeno di Montagna, a municipality in the Province of Verona, Veneto
San Zeno Naviglio, a municipality in the Province of Brescia, Lombardy
Sanzeno, a municipality in the Province of Trento, Trentino-South Tyrol
San Zeno (quarter), a quarter of Verona, Veneto
San Zeno (Arezzo), a civil parish of Arezzo, Tuscany
San Zeno (Cassola), a civil parish of Cassola (VI), Veneto

Colombia
San Zenón, a municipality of the Department of Magdalena, Caribbean region

Religious buildings
Basilica of San Zeno, Verona, a church in Verona, Veneto
San Zeno, Pisa, a church in Pisa, Tuscany
Pistoia Cathedral (or Cathedral of San Zeno), a church in Pistoia, Tuscany

See also
 Zeno (disambiguation)
 San Zenone (disambiguation)
 Zenon (disambiguation)